JT may refer to:

Arts and media
 Jakobstads Tidning, a Finland-Swedish newspaper
 Jimma Times, owner of the Ethiopian newspaper Yeroo
 Jornal da Tarde, a Brazilian newspaper from São Paulo
 JT (album), 1977 album by James Taylor
 J.T. (album), 2021 album  by Steve Earle & The Dukes
 J.T. Lambert, a character in the American television sitcom  Step by Step
 J.T. Martin, a character in the TV sitcom Silver Spoons
 JT LeRoy, a literary persona created in the 1990s by American writer Laura Albert
 J.T. Yorke, a character in Degrassi: The Next Generation

Businesses and organizations
 Japan Tobacco, a cigarette manufacturer
 Jersey Telecom, the Jersey telephone company
 JT, the IATA airline designator for Lion Air

People

In arts and entertainment
 James "J.T." Taylor (born 1953), lead singer of the band Kool and the Gang
 JT the Bigga Figga (born 1971), a hip-hop artist and producer
 J. T. the Brick (born 1965), an American talk radio host
 J. T. Brown (disambiguation)
 JT Hodges (born 1977), country music singer
 JT Longoria, former member of the band Adler's Appetite
 JT Money (born 1972), American rapper
 J.T. Smith (disambiguation)
 J. T. Southern (born 1964), former American professional wrestler
 J. T. Thomas (disambiguation)
 J. T. Walsh, American actor
 J. T. Wedgwood (1782–1856), an English line engraver
 Justin Timberlake (born 1981), an American singer and actor
 JT, member of American rap duo City Girls

In sport
J. T. Miller (born 1993), American ice hockey player
 J. T. O'Sullivan (born 1979), American football player
J. T. Realmuto (born 1991), American baseball player
Jesse Taylor (born 1984), mixed martial artist also known as JT Money
J. T. Snow (born 1968), American baseball player
J. T. Thatcher (born 1978), American football player
JT Woods (born 1999), American football player
 Johnathan Thurston (born 1983), an Australian rugby league footballer
 Justin Thomas (born 1993), American golfer

In other fields
 Javier Torres Félix (born 1960), Mexican drug lord also known for his alias J.T.

Science and technology
 Haplogroup JT (mtDNA), a human mitochondrial DNA haplogroup
 JT (visualization format), a 3D data format

Other uses
 Junior technician, an airman rank
 Juneteenth